The 1990–91 NBA season was the Detroit Pistons' 43rd season in the National Basketball Association, and 34th season in the city of Detroit. The Pistons entered the season as both the three-time defending Eastern Conference Champions the two-time defending NBA Champions and looked to win a third consecutive title. The team posted a nine-game winning streak in November as they finished the first month of the season with a 13–2 record. However, they would lose six of their next seven games in early December, but held a 34–15 record at the All-Star break. Midway through the season, the Pistons won eleven consecutive games, finishing second in the Central Division with a 50–32 record, eleven games behind the Chicago Bulls.

Joe Dumars led the team in scoring with 20.4 points, and averaged 5.5 assists per game, and last year's Finals MVP Isiah Thomas averaged 16.2 points, 9.3 assists and 1.6 steals per game, but only played just 48 games this season due to a wrist injury. Sixth man Mark Aguirre provided the team with 14.2 points per game off the bench, while Dennis Rodman averaged 8.2 points, and led the team with 12.5 rebounds per game, and was named Defensive Player of the Year for the second straight season. In addition, James Edwards contributed 13.6 points per game, while Vinnie Johnson provided with 11.7 points per game, Bill Laimbeer averaged 11.0 points and 9.0 rebounds per game, and John Salley led the team with 1.5 blocks per game off the bench. Thomas and Dumars were both selected for the 1991 NBA All-Star Game, but Thomas did not play due to injury. Dumars was named to the All-NBA Third Team, and NBA All-Defensive Second Team, while Rodman was selected to the NBA All-Defensive First Team.

Entering the playoffs as the No. 3 seed in the Eastern Conference, the Pistons lost Game 1 at home, 103–98 to the 6th-seeded Atlanta Hawks in the Eastern Conference First Round, but managed to win the series 3–2. In the Eastern Conference Semi-finals, they trailed 2–1 to Larry Bird and the Boston Celtics, but managed to win the series 4–2. This put the Pistons in their fifth consecutive Eastern Conference Finals, where they would be swept by the Bulls and be denied a fourth consecutive appearance in the NBA Finals. The Bulls would reach the NBA Finals for the first time, and defeat the Los Angeles Lakers in five games, winning their first ever championship.

Toward the end of the loss to the Bulls in Game 4, which occurred on the Pistons' home floor at The Palace of Auburn Hills, most of the Pistons' players walked off the court toward the locker room without congratulating their opponents or shaking hands. It was seen as a sign of disrespect by the outgoing champions, and was concocted by Thomas and Bill Laimbeer in response to comments made by Michael Jordan about the Pistons' physical playing style being bad for basketball, and that he felt the league would be happy to see the Pistons lose.

Following the season, Edwards was traded to the Los Angeles Clippers, and Johnson signed as a free agent with the San Antonio Spurs.

Draft picks

Roster

Regular season

Season standings

z - clinched division title
y - clinched division title
x - clinched playoff spot

Record vs. opponents

Game log

Playoffs

|- align="center" bgcolor="#ffcccc"
| 1
| April 26
| Atlanta
| L 98–103
| Joe Dumars (20)
| Laimbeer, Rodman (11)
| Isiah Thomas (14)
| The Palace of Auburn Hills21,454
| 0–1
|- align="center" bgcolor="#ccffcc"
| 2
| April 28
| Atlanta
| W 101–88
| Joe Dumars (28)
| Dennis Rodman (10)
| Isiah Thomas (8)
| The Palace of Auburn Hills21,454
| 1–1
|- align="center" bgcolor="#ccffcc"
| 3
| April 30
| @ Atlanta
| W 103–91
| Joe Dumars (30)
| Dennis Rodman (13)
| Isiah Thomas (13)
| Omni Coliseum13,571
| 2–1
|- align="center" bgcolor="#ffcccc"
| 4
| May 2
| @ Atlanta
| L 111–123
| Vinnie Johnson (26)
| Dennis Rodman (12)
| Isiah Thomas (12)
| Omni Coliseum9,854
| 2–2
|- align="center" bgcolor="#ccffcc"
| 5
| May 5
| Atlanta
| W 113–81
| Isiah Thomas (26)
| Dennis Rodman (20)
| Isiah Thomas (11)
| The Palace of Auburn Hills21,454
| 3–2
|-

|- align="center" bgcolor="#ccffcc"
| 1
| May 7
| @ Boston
| W 86–75
| James Edwards (18)
| Dennis Rodman (16)
| Isiah Thomas (13)
| Boston Garden14,890
| 1–0
|- align="center" bgcolor="#ffcccc"
| 2
| May 9
| @ Boston
| L 103–109
| Joe Dumars (29)
| Bill Laimbeer (15)
| Joe Dumars (6)
| Boston Garden14,890
| 1–1
|- align="center" bgcolor="#ffcccc"
| 3
| May 11
| Boston
| L 83–115
| James Edwards (13)
| Laimbeer, Rodman (12)
| Vinnie Johnson (5)
| The Palace of Auburn Hills21,454
| 1–2
|- align="center" bgcolor="#ccffcc"
| 4
| May 13
| Boston
| W 104–97
| Mark Aguirre (34)
| Dennis Rodman (18)
| Joe Dumars (8)
| The Palace of Auburn Hills21,454
| 2–2
|- align="center" bgcolor="#ccffcc"
| 5
| May 15
| @ Boston
| W 116–111
| Joe Dumars (32)
| Dennis Rodman (10)
| Joe Dumars (8)
| Boston Garden14,890
| 3–2
|- align="center" bgcolor="#ccffcc"
| 6
| May 17
| Boston
| W 117–113 (OT)
| Joe Dumars (32)
| Bill Laimbeer (14)
| Joe Dumars (10)
| The Palace of Auburn Hills21,454
| 4–2
|-

|- align="center" bgcolor="#ffcccc"
| 1
| May 19
| @ Chicago
| L 83–94
| Mark Aguirre (25)
| Dennis Rodman (9)
| Isiah Thomas (8)
| Chicago Stadium18,676
| 0–1
|- align="center" bgcolor="#ffcccc"
| 2
| May 21
| @ Chicago
| L 97–105
| Vinnie Johnson (29)
| Dennis Rodman (11)
| Dumars, Thomas (5)
| Chicago Stadium18,676
| 0–2
|- align="center" bgcolor="#ffcccc"
| 3
| May 25
| Chicago
| L 107–113
| Isiah Thomas (29)
| four players tied (7)
| Isiah Thomas (6)
| The Palace of Auburn Hills21,454
| 0–3
|- align="center" bgcolor="#ffcccc"
| 4
| May 27
| Chicago
| L 94–115
| Isiah Thomas (16)
| Thomas, Johnson (7)
| Isiah Thomas (5)
| The Palace of Auburn Hills21,454
| 0–4
|-

Player statistics

Regular season

Playoffs

Player Statistics Citation:

Awards and records
Dennis Rodman, NBA Defensive Player of the Year Award
Joe Dumars, All-NBA Third Team
Joe Dumars, NBA All-Defensive Second Team
Dennis Rodman, NBA All-Defensive First Team

Transactions

References

See also
1990-91 NBA season

Detroit Pistons seasons
Detroit
Detroit
Detroit